Shevchenko is a rural locality (a khutor) in Gabukayskoye Rural Settlement of Teuchezhsky District, the Republic of Adygea, Russia. The population was 649 as of 2018. There are 9 streets.

Geography 
Shevchenko is located 13 km east of Ponezhukay (the district's administrative centre) by road. Petrov is the nearest rural locality.

References 

Rural localities in Teuchezhsky District